Swatting is a criminal harassment tactic of deceiving an emergency service (via such means as hoaxing an emergency services dispatcher) into sending a police or emergency service response team to another person's address. This is triggered by false reporting of a serious law enforcement emergency, such as a bomb threat, murder, hostage situation, or a false report of a mental health emergency, such as reporting that a person is allegedly suicidal or homicidal and may or may not be armed, among other things.

The term is derived from the law enforcement unit "SWAT" (special weapons and tactics), a specialized type of police unit in the United States. These units are equipped with tactical gear and weapons that differ from patrol units, and are called to situations that are deemed high-risk. A threat may result in the evacuations of schools and businesses. Advocates have called for swatting to be described as terrorism due to its use to intimidate and create the risk of injury or death.

Making false reports to emergency services is a criminal offense in many jurisdictions, often punishable by fine or imprisonment. In March 2019, a California man was sentenced to 20 years in prison for carrying out a fatal 2017 swatting. Swatting carries a high risk of violence, and causes tax dollars to be wasted by the city or county when responding to a false report of a serious law enforcement emergency, as well as liability if things go wrong. In California, swatters bear the "full cost" of the response which can lead to fines up to $10,000 if great bodily injury or death occur as a result of the swatting.

Origins 
Bomb threats were a concern to police in the 1970s, with some public buildings such as airports being evacuated in response to hoax calls that were designed to cause mass panic and public disruption, or to delay exams at educational institutions. In recent decades, hoax callers sometimes make use of techniques to disguise their identity or country of origin.

Swatting has origins in prank calls to emergency services. Over the years, callers used increasingly sophisticated techniques to direct response units of particular types. In particular, attempts to have SWAT teams be dispatched to particular locations spawned the term swatting. The term was used by the FBI as early as 2008, and has also entered into Oxford Dictionaries Online in 2015.

Techniques 
Caller ID spoofing, social engineering, TTY, prank calls, and phone phreaking techniques may be variously combined by swatting perpetrators. 911 systems (including computer telephony systems and human operators) have been tricked by calls placed from cities hundreds of miles away from the location of the purported call, or even from other countries. The caller typically places a 911 call using a spoofed phone number (so as to hide the fraudulent caller's real location) with the goal of tricking emergency authorities into responding with a SWAT team to a fabricated emergency.

Swatting is linked to the action of doxing, which is obtaining and broadcasting, often via the Internet, the address and details of an individual with an intent to harass or endanger them.

Measures against swatting 
In October 2018, the Seattle Police Department took a three-pronged approach to combating swatting: educating 911 dispatchers to identify potential swatting calls, ensuring responding officers are aware of the potential for a hoax situation, and creating an opt-in registry for people who fear that they might become victims of swatting, such as journalists, celebrities, or live streamers. Using the registry, these people can provide cautionary information to the police, which will inform officers responding to potential swatting attempts targeted at the victim's address.

Security reporter Brian Krebs recommends that police departments take extra care when responding to calls received at their non-emergency numbers, or through text-to-speech services (TTY), since these methods are often employed by out-of-area swatters who cannot connect to the regional 911 center. 

In September 2019, the Seattle Police Department formed the Swatting Mitigation Advisory Committee, a group of subject matter experts, both community and police representatives. The purpose of the committee is to better understand swatting by collecting and analyzing data, formalizing protocols, and advocating for broader awareness and prevention. The committee is currently co-chaired by Naveed Jamali and Sean Whitcomb, creator of the anti-swatting registry.

Laws

United States 

In the United States, swatting can be prosecuted through federal criminal statutes:
 "Threatening interstate communications"
 "Conspiracy to retaliate against a witness, victim, or informant"
 "Conspiracy to commit access device fraud and unauthorized access of a protected computer"
 An accomplice may be found guilty of "conspiring to obstruct justice"
 In California, callers bear the "full cost" of the response which can range up to $10,000

In 2011, California State Senator Ted Lieu authored a bill to increase penalties for swatting. His own family became a victim of swatting when the bill was proposed. A dozen police officers, along with firefighters and paramedics surrounded his family home.

In 2015, New Jersey State Assemblyman Paul D. Moriarty announced a bill to increase sentences for hoax emergency calls, and was targeted by a hoax. The bill proposed prison sentences up to ten years and fines up to $150,000.

A 2015 bipartisan bill in Congress sponsored by Katherine Clark and Patrick Meehan made swatting a federal crime with increased penalties. Congresswoman Clark wrote an op-ed in The Hill saying that 2.5 million cases of cyberstalking between 2010 and 2013 had only resulted in 10 cases prosecuted, although a source for this was not provided. As revenge for the bill, an anonymous caller fraudulently called police to Rep. Clark's house on January 31, 2016.

Injuries or deaths due to swatting

2015 incident 
On January 15, 2015, in Sentinel, Washita County, Oklahoma, dispatchers received 911 calls from someone who identified himself as Dallas Horton and told dispatchers he had placed a bomb in a local preschool. Washita County sheriff's deputies and Sentinel police chief Louis Ross made forced entry into Horton's residence. Ross, who was wearing a bulletproof vest, was shot several times by Horton. Further investigation revealed that the calls did not originate from the residence, and led Oklahoma State Bureau of Investigation agents to believe Horton was unaware that it was law enforcement officers making entry. James Edward Holly confessed to investigators that he made the calls with two "nonfunctioning" phones because he was angry with Horton. Ross, who was shot multiple times in the chest and arm, was injured, but was treated for his wounds, and released from a local hospital.

2017 incident 

On December 28, 2017, a Wichita police officer shot a civilian named Andrew Finch in Finch's Kansas residence in a swatting incident. Finch later died at a hospital. Based on a series of screenshotted Twitter posts, the Wichita Eagle suggests that Finch was the unintended victim of the swatting after two Call of Duty: WWII players on the same team got into a heated argument about a $1.50 (USD) bet. On December 29, 2017, the Los Angeles Police Department arrested 25-year-old serial swatter Tyler Raj Barriss, known online as "SWAuTistic" and on Xbox Live as "GoredTutor36," in connection with the incident. In 2018, Barriss was indicted by a federal grand jury along with two others involved in the incident. According to U.S. Attorney Stephen McAllister, the hoax charge carries a maximum punishment of life in federal prison while other charges carry sentences of up to 20 years. On March 29, 2019, Barriss was sentenced to 20 years' imprisonment. The gamer that recruited Barriss in the bet pleaded guilty to felony charges of conspiracy and obstruction of justice, and was sentenced to prison for 15 months as well as a two-year ban on playing video games.

2020 incident 
On April 27, 2020, Mark Herring, a sixty-year-old man from Bethpage, Tennessee, died of a heart attack after police responded to false reports of a woman being killed at Herring's house. The swatting was organized in an attempt to force the man to give up his Twitter handle "@tennessee". Shane Sonderman was sentenced to five years in prison for the swatting, and ordered to pay a $250,000 USD fine. A minor in the United Kingdom was also involved, but he cannot be extradited or identified due to being underage.

Other notable cases 

In 2013, a number of U.S. celebrities became the victims of swatting, including Sean Combs (P. Diddy). In the past, there have been swatting incidents at the residences of Ashton Kutcher, Tom Cruise, Chris Brown, Miley Cyrus, Iggy Azalea, Jason Derulo, Snoop Dogg, Justin Bieber, and Clint Eastwood.
	
In 2013, a network of fraudsters involved in carding and doxing of public officials using stolen credit reports targeted computer security expert Brian Krebs with malicious police reports. Mir Islam, the leader of the group, had also used swatting hoaxes against prosecutor Stephen P. Heymann, congressman Mike Rogers, and against a girl he was cyberstalking who turned down his romantic proposals. Islam was convicted for doxing and swatting over 50 public figures, including Michelle Obama, Robert Mueller, John Brennan as well as Krebs, and was sentenced to two years in prison. The Ukrainian computer hacker Sergey Vovnenko was convicted of trafficking in stolen credit cards, as well as planning to purchase heroin, ship it to Brian Krebs, and then swat him. He was sentenced to 15 months in prison in Italy, and 41 months in prison in New Jersey.

In April 2013 California State Senator Ted Lieu, who at the time pushed for anti-swatting laws in the state, was swatted.

Hal Finney, a paralyzed computer scientist with ALS, was swatted in 2014 after refusing to pay a $400,000 ransom. Finney faced cold, unsafe conditions on his lawn for a half hour while police were clearing his house. He continued receiving threats until his death in August 2014.

Due to the popularity of streaming services, many broadcasters became the victim of swatting. Two weeks after the Fortnite World Cup Finals, where 16-year-old Kyle "Bugha" Giersdorf won $3 million and the title of best solo Fortnite player, he was swatted while streaming live on Twitch. Ben "DrLupo" Lupo stated he was swatted three times in one month. Other popular gaming broadcasters have been victims of swatting, including Tyler "Ninja" Blevins.

In July 2022, Emmet G. Sullivan, a U.S. federal judge presiding over cases pertaining to the January 6 United States Capitol attack, was the victim of a swatting incident.

On August 5, 2022, Canadian transgender streamer and political commentator Clara "Keffals" Sorrenti was swatted at her home by unknown individuals who impersonated her, and sent a threatening email and photo of an illegal firearm to London city councillors. It is presumed this is due to a harassment campaign carried out by Kiwi Farms, dating back to March 21, 2022. Sorrenti claims she was repeatedly misgendered and deadnamed by London Police officers, and placed into custody for 11 hours before being released without charges. Sorrenti states she believes the incident to be a hate crime, as a result of prejudice and harassment towards transgender people due to anti-LGBTQ movements within the United States. The London Police Service responded with a statement from Chief of Police Steve Williams. He asserts that while he cannot confirm any language used before Sorrenti's arrest, she was not addressed by her deadname or previous gender while inside the agency's holding cells. He also states any reference to Sorrenti's deadname during the investigation seems to stem from the existence of prior police reports she had accumulated before this event. Three other streamers, Adin Ross, Nadia Amine, and IShowSpeed, were also swatted the same week as Sorrenti.

In August 2022, U.S. representative Marjorie Taylor Greene was swatted in Georgia by a caller who allegedly opposed Greene's stances on transgender rights.

See also 

 Computer security
 Mobbing

References

Further reading 
 
 
 
 
 

Computer security exploits
Confidence tricks
2000s neologisms
Law enforcement controversies in the United States
Video game controversies
Video game culture